Li Jie may refer to:

Sportspeople
 Li Jie (footballer) (born 1979), female Chinese footballer
 Li Jie (handballer) (born 1955), Chinese handball player
 Li Jie (rifle shooter) (born 1979), male Chinese sports shooter
 Li Jie (running target shooter) (born 1973), male Chinese sports shooter
 Li Jie (swimmer) (born 1983), female Chinese butterfly swimmer
 Li Jie (table tennis) (born 1984), female Dutch table tennis player

Others
 Emperor Zhaozong of Tang (867–904), originally named Li Jie
 Li Jie (author) (1065–1110), author of the Yingzao Fashi
 Li Jie (geologist) (1894–1977), Chinese geologist who supervised the 1927 excavations at Peking Man Site
 Lee Jye (born 1940), former Minister of National Defense of Taiwan
 Leon Lai (born 1964), Hong Kong singer and actor, born Li Jie
 Anni Baobei (born 1974), Chinese novelist whose real name is Li Jie
 Li Jie (actor) (born 1975), Chinese actor
 Li Jie (Go player) (born 1981), amateur Go player in the US
 Li Jie (guitar player) (born 1981), Chinese classical guitar player

See also
 Jason Scott Lee (born 1966), American actor and martial artist, whose Chinese name is romanized in pinyin as Li Jie
 Li Ji (disambiguation)
 Lijie (as a given name, multiple people)